The Patriot Party was a political party in Indonesia. It was established as the Pancasila Patriot's Party as a result of a deliberations at the sixth national conference of the Pancasila Youth organization in 1996. At the time, the organization's political goals were channeled by Golkar, but in its conference the year after the 1998 Fall of Suharto, Pancasila Youth withdrew from Golkar. The conference also decided the time was right to establish a political party, and it was declared on 1 June 2001, the anniversary of Sukarno's Pancasila speech. The party was officially and legally established two years later. Thus the Patriot Party was described as the political wing of the Pancasila Youth.

In the 2004 Indonesian legislative election, the party only won 0.9% of the popular vote and no seats. The party therefore had to change its name and undergo the ratification process by the General Elections Commission name to allow it to contest the 2009 elections. In the 2009 elections, the party only won 0.5 percent of the vote, less than the 2.5 percent electoral threshold, meaning it was awarded no seats in the People's Representative Council.

Following its poor result in the 2009 vote, the party joined nine other smaller parties to form the National Unity Party, another short-lived party.

References

Pancasila political parties
Political parties in Indonesia